Colin Heffron (born 6 December 1992) is a professional footballer who plays as a defender.

Career

Youth and college
Heffron was born in London and moved to Upper Brookville, New York at a young age, had a successful career at Friends Academy before joining the Dartmouth Big Green in 2011. Heffron was a four-year starter for Dartmouth and played in 63 games and had nine goals and 15 assists in his collegiate career.

Professional
Heffron went on trial with Major League Soccer club New York Red Bulls during the 2015 pre-season. He caught the attention of the club and signed with New York Red Bulls II for the 2015 season. He made his debut as a starter for the side in its first ever match on 28 March 2015 in a 0–0 draw with Rochester Rhinos. His performance against Rochester earned Heffron USL Team of the Week honours as he played both as a centre back and left back during the match.

On 23 July 2015, Heffron made his debut with the New York Red Bulls first team in a 4–2 victory over Premier League Champions Chelsea in a 2015 International Champions Cup match. Heffron assisted Sean Davis on his second goal of the match.

References

External links 
 
 Dartmouth player profile 
USSDA  profile
newyorkredbulls.com

1992 births
Living people
English footballers
English expatriate footballers
Dartmouth Big Green men's soccer players
New York Red Bulls II players
Association football defenders
Expatriate soccer players in the United States
USL Championship players
English expatriate sportspeople in the United States